The Outer Ring is an only partially completed ring road in Munich.

Routes
The Outer Ring was not planned as a circular street, but was planned as a series of relatively straight streets that would be connected by curved sections of road. However, only parts of the original plan were constructed. For example, the bridge over the Isar in the south was never built. On the other hand, the northern section was built with a bridge over the Isar, which was originally not planned because of the Autobahn bridge planned to be located relatively close to it down the Isar.

References
Baureferat der Landeshauptstadt München (Hrsg.): Bauen in München 1960–1970. Harbeke Verlag, München 1970 (in German)

Ring roads in Germany
Streets in Munich